St Paul's High School is a co-educational, Roman Catholic comprehensive secondary school located in Pollok, Glasgow, Scotland. It was built on the site of, and using some buildings from, the former Craigbank Secondary School, to replace the previous Catholic school in the area, Bellarmine Secondary (the Silverburn Centre is now at its location), opening with its new identity in 2002.

The majority of the Pollok district falls into the catchment area of a different school, Lourdes Secondary, while St Paul's serves communities further south including Arden, Carnwadric, Darnley, Deaconsbank, Eastwood, Househillwood, Kennishead, Nitshill, Parkhouse and Priesthill.

References

External links
St Paul's High School's page on Scottish Schools Online
St Paul's Official Website

Catholic secondary schools in Glasgow
2002 establishments in Scotland
Educational institutions established in 2002
Buildings and structures completed in 2002